Tree injection—also known as trunk injection or stem injection,—is a method of targeting a precise application of pesticides, plant resistance activators, or fertilizers into the xylem vascular tissue of a tree with the purpose of protecting the tree from pests, or to inject nutrients to correct for nutrient deficiencies. This method largely relies on harnessing the tree's vascular system to translocate and distribute the active compounds into the wood, canopy and roots where protection or nutrition is needed. 

Tree injection is currently the most popular method for control of damaging insects, pathogens, and nematodes in landscape tree care.

Description 

Trunk injection has been developed primarily for use on large size trees and in proximity of urban areas where ground- and air-spray applications are impractical due to substantial drift-driven pesticide losses or not allowed due to potential human exposure. However, the prime driver of tree injection use has been a wide spread need for control of many invasive tree pathogens and insects pests. The most infamous examples are that of Ophiostoma fungi that cause Dutch Elm Disease (DED) and insect Emerald ash borer (Agrilus planipennis) which have specific biologies that lead to severe internal damage of wood and thus tree death, and which make their management extremely difficult or inefficient with classical pesticide application methods. Trunk injection for tree protection is viewed as environmentally safer alternative for pesticide application since the compound is delivered within the tree, thus allowing for selective exposure to plant pests. In landscapes and urban zones trunk injection significantly reduces the non-target exposure of water, soil, air, and wildlife to pesticides and fertilizers. In the last 20 years, tree injection is gaining momentum with the development and availability of new, efficient injection devices and injectable and xylem mobile formulations of pesticides, biopesticides and nutrients. 

Trunk injection works by adding a water soluble chemical directly into the lower stem of the tree structure.

Applications 

A number of newly occurring and fast spreading invasive insect pests and diseases such as Polyphagous Shot Hole Borer (PSHB) (Euwallacea spp.), which can vector plant pathogenic fungus Fusarium euwallaceae, and Sudden Oak Death (SOD) caused by an Oomycete Phytophthora ramorum, establish the use of trunk injection as the most efficient tree protection technique in landscapes and urban forestry.

In the past and recently, trunk injection of pesticides and plant resistance activators has been investigated in agriculture for control of pathogens and insect pests on fruit tree crops and grapevines. The most investigated are diseases and pests of avocado, apple, and grapevine, such as Phytophthora root rot of avocado Phytophthora cinnamomi and avocado thrips Scirtothrips perseae, fire blight Erwinia amylovora and apple scab Venturia inaequalis, oblique banded leaf roller Choristoneura rosaceana and codling moth Cydia pomonella, and grapevine downy mildew Plasmopara viticola and powdery mildew Uncinula necator. Apple trees are especially interesting as a research model in agriculture since it is known that apple production requires intensive spray schedules for control of pathogenic fungus V. inaequalis with as many as 15-22 sprays of fungicides per season in humid climate. 

Trunk injection of pesticides is considered as an option for precise compound delivery which will reduce the negative impact of drift-driven pesticide losses in the environment, that occur after aerial or ground spraying of pesticides. Besides negative consequences of frequent pesticide applications in the environment, stem injection of grapevines is investigated in viticulture for control of pathogens with difficult biologies which infect and destroy woody tissues and that cannot be controlled efficiently by canopy spray applications of fungicides. To increase the efficiency of injected compounds in trees and vines, important considerations are plant anatomy, weather and soil conditions, tree physiology processes, spatial and temporal distribution of injected compound, and the chemical properties of injected compound and formulation.

References

Forestry